The Maryland-District of Columbia Campus Compact (MDCCC) is an educational association whose membership is made up of colleges and universities in Maryland and Washington, DC.

Member institutions

The organization is composed of 33 affiliate members.

 American University
 Bowie State University
 Carroll Community College
 Catholic University of America
 Chesapeake College
 Coppin State University
 Frostburg State University
 Gallaudet University
 Garrett College
 George Washington University
 Georgetown University
 Goucher College
 Hood College
 Howard Community College
 Johns Hopkins University
 Loyola University Maryland
 Maryland Institute College of Art
 McDaniel College
 Montgomery College
 Morgan State University
 Notre Dame of Maryland University
 Prince George's Community College
 Salisbury University
 St. Mary's College of Maryland
 Stevenson University
 Towson University
 University of Baltimore
 University of the District of Columbia
 University of Maryland, Baltimore
 University of Maryland, Baltimore County
 University of Maryland, College Park
 University of Maryland Eastern Shore
 Washington Adventist University
 Wesley Theological Seminary

References

College and university associations and consortia in North America